"Zebra" is a song by American dream pop band Beach House from their third studio album, Teen Dream. It was written by lead vocalist and keyboardist Victoria Legrand and guitarist Alex Scally and produced by them along with Chris Coady. The song was released as the third single off the album on April 17, 2010, with an EP of the same name which features a UK radio edit of the song along with new tracks "The Arrangement", "Baby" and a remix of "10 Mile Stereo".

Critical reception 
Consequence of Sound stated the song "grows and grows within the space it is given, and though we are not talking about the epic scale of, say, The Arcade Fire, they are not too far off either." BBC said the song "slaloms to life on a loping, vertiginous riff that keeps sliding sideways when you think you know where it’s going. Over it, Legrand's vocals ooze like molasses before rising imperiously to deliver a swooning chorus hook-line, about the titular "black and white horse", that Bat for Lashes would kill for." Pretty Much Amazing said the song is "a gorgeous highlight" off its parent album. Zach Schonfeld of PopMatters said "Zebra" remains "one of Teen Dream’s most irresistible moments, buoyed by yearning vocal sighs and lyrics describing its eponymous "black and white horse arching among us"," as well as commenting on the other tracks of the EP, stating that between the "waltz-like, minor key "Baby" and the lilting, damn near sing-songy "The Arrangement", the latter is the clear highlight," while finishing the review saying the EP is "a worthy encore to an outstanding LP". Impose Magazine said "the track elegantly blossoms into a gorgeous crescendo of oozy voices and crashing cymbals."

Music video 
The official music video for "Zebra" was directed by Mark Brown and was uploaded to Sub Pop's YouTube channel on May 21, 2010. The video features "reverberating colors, a fiery desert, perhaps, shrouded by smeared yellows and oranges pulsating erratically."

Track listings 
 Digital download
 "Zebra" (UK Radio Edit) (3:57)
 "The Arrangement" (5:03)
 "Baby" (3:01)
 "10 Mile Stereo" (Cough Syrup Remix) (5:28)
 US CD single
 "Zebra" (UK Radio Edit) (3:57)
 "The Arrangement" (5:03)
 "Baby" (3:01)
 "10 Mile Stereo" (Cough Syrup Remix) (5:28)
 12" single
Side A
 "Zebra" (UK Radio Edit) (3:57)
 "The Arrangement" (5:03)
Side B
 "Baby" (3:01)
 "10 Mile Stereo" (Cough Syrup Remix) (5:28)

Personnel
Beach House
 Beach House – production, composition, arrangement
 Alex Scally – guitar, bass, organ, piano, background vocals
 Victoria Legrand – vocals, keyboards, organ, bells
Additional
 Chris Coady – production, engineering, mixing (tracks 1, 2, 4)
 Jason Quever – drums, recording, mixing (track 3)
 Dan Franz – drums, percussion (tracks 1, 2, 4)
 Graham Hill – drums, percussion (tracks 1, 2, 4)
 Nilesh Patel – mastering

References

2010 singles
2010 songs
Sub Pop singles
Beach House songs
Songs written by Victoria Legrand